Yinhai may refer to:

Yinhai District, in Beihai, Guangxi, China
3340 Yinhai, main-belt asteroid